Tai Laing (variously spelt Tai Lai or Tai Nai), also known as Shan-ni, is a Tai language of Burma, related to Khamti. It is written in its own variant of Burmese script, and though not taught in schools, is experiencing a cultural revival, albeit still small. There is no census of speakers, but they are estimated to number around 100,000.

History 
The Tai Laing settled in the Indawgyi Lake valley, in modern-day Kachin State, Myanmar, establishing city-states including Mongyang, Mogaung, Wuntho, and Momeik. Tai Laing has had long-term close contact with several Tibeto-Burman languages, including Burmese speakers to the south, Lolo-Burmese, Nungish, and Jingpho-Luish languages to the east and north and Naga languages to the west. These languages have influenced the phonology and grammar of Tai Laing, including the frequency of disyllabic words and presence of different grammatical markers, and variation in word order. 

Following the 1962 Burmese coup d'état, restrictive language policies were promulgated by the military regime. The Kachin Independence Organization also repressed Tai Laing speakers, who lived in contested territory. In the 1990s, a military ceasefire enabled the Tai Laing to recover manuscripts, publish literacy books, and teach the language in summer schools. During the 2011–2015 Myanmar political reforms, Khin Pyone Yee was appointed Kachin State's Minister of Shan Affairs. She spearheaded a program to institutionalize Tai Laing education materials and curricula.

While Tai Laing is experiencing a linguistic revival driven by youth, many Tai Laing are now bilingual or monolingual in Burmese, due to assimilation and intermarriage with Burmese speakers.

Names
Alternate names for Tai Laing are Red Tai, Shan Bamar, Shan Kalee, Shan-ni (ရှမ်းနီ), Tai Laeng, Tai Lai, Tai Lang, Tai Nai, and Tai Naing (Ethnologue).

Distribution
Tai Laing is spoken in Homalin Township, Sagaing Region, along the Chindwin, Irrawaddy, and Uru rivers. It is also spoken in Kachin State from Bhamo to Myitkyina townships (Ethnologue).

Dialects
There are two subgroups of Tai Laing, namely Tai Nai and Tai Lai. The Tai Nai live along the railway line between Myitkyina and Mandalay. The Tai Lai live along the river south of Myitkyina (Ethnologue).

References

Languages of Myanmar
Southwestern Tai languages